Pashkevich is a surname which ultimately comes from the East Slav personal name Pashka or Pashko, a diminutive of  Pavel (Paul). The surname may refer to:

Alaiza Pashkevich (1876–1916), Belarusian poet and political activist
Andrey Pashkevich (1945-2011), Russian cinematographer and painter
Igor Pashkevich (1971–2016), Russian figure skater
Vasily Pashkevich (1742–1797), Russian musician
Yekaterina Pashkevich (born 1972), Russian ice hockey player

See also
Paskevich

References

Belarusian-language surnames
Russian-language surnames